Navan (formerly TripActions) is an online travel management, corporate card and expense management company.

History
The Palo Alto, Californiabased travel company, TripActions Inc., was founded in May 2015 by Ariel Cohen and Ilan Twig (also the founders of StreamOnce, acquired by Jive Software).

In January 2016, TripActions received $14.6 million series A round led by Oren Zeev Ventures and Lightspeed Venture Partners with participation from Group 11. The company officially launched out of stealth mode and announced their funding in January 2017. In October 2017, the company announced that they had raised an additional $12.5 million led by Lightspeed Venture Partners with participation from Zeev Ventures and Group 11.

The company moved in June 2017 from Menlo Park, California, to its headquarters in Palo Alto.

In March 2018, the company announced a $51 million Series B round led by the same two investors with participation from prior investors.

In July 2018, TripActions announced its international expansion to Europe with an office in London and their European headquarters in Amsterdam. They shared potential plans to expand to the Asia-Pacific region to scale their customer support infrastructure.

In September 2018, the company opened an office in Sydney, Australia.

In November 2018, the company announced a valuation north of $1 billion and a $154 million Series C funding round led by new investor Andreessen Horowitz, with participation from repeat investors Lightspeed Venture Partners, Zeev Ventures, and Group 11.  Ben Horowitz joined the Board of Directors.

In February 2019, the company announced its new flight storefront in alignment with major airline partners and industry association ATPCO. The storefront includes branding and imagery of cabin classes and amenities for each airline. It works for domestic and international flights, including international-to-international itineraries, and for flights on joint venture partners of American, Delta and United.

Later in February 2019, TripActions was recognized as one of Fast Company's Most Innovative Companies in Travel for 2019.

In June 2019, the company announced its NDC-enabled platform in partnership with United Airlines. At the same time, TripActions raised a $250 million Series D funding round from Andreessen Horowitz, Zeev Ventures, Lightspeed Venture Partners and Group 11. The total valuation of the company reached $4 billion.

In September 2019, the company announced its carbon impact initiative through providing customers visibility into the emission output of their travel programs. In the same month, TripActions was recognized in the Top 20 of the Forbes Cloud 100 award.

In November 2019, the company announced that it had enabled an NDC-enabled direct connection to the Lufthansa Group.

In February 2020, the companylaunched TripActions Liquid, a payment, expense and reconciliation technology integrated into its core platform. Alongside that announcement, the company announced the security of $500 million on credit to fuel the platform.

In June 2020, it raised $125 million in debt financing.

In October 2020, it expanded the TripActions Liquid product by adding broader expense capabilities.

In January 2021, TripActions raised a $155 million Series E round of funding.

In May 2021, the company announced that it had acquired UK corporate travel management specialist Reed & Mackay.

In October 2021, TripActions raised a $275 million Series F round of funding with a valuation near $7.25 billion. It reported having 1500 employees.

In February 2022, TripActions acquired Comtravo, a German corporate travel company with 2,500 clients and 250 employees.

In February 2023, TripActions rebranded to Navan, bringing together its offerings into a travel and expense super app. The palindrome name Navan has roots in the words navigate and avant (as navigate forward).

Services
All functionality including administrative travel management can be done through the desktop and mobile application, including booking trips, filing receipts, modifying reservations, tracking travel itineraries, chatting with travel support agents reconciling expenses.

TripActions partners with multiple suppliers in the market Inventory on the platform comes from consumer, corporate, and direct integrations.

TripActions Liquid provides a suite of tools to manage and track spend. With physical and virtual cards, smart approval workflows, automated expense reports and centralized billing, the technology is positioned as a modern alternative to legacy payment and expense systems.

The platform uses artificial intelligence and machine learning to optimize search results, inventory and the support experience. Results are prioritized using the company's policies, real-time market prices and individual employee preferences including loyalty program memberships.

The system's admin dashboard tracks company spend, potential savings, and employees' travel and spend patterns. In accordance with duty of care, the admin dashboard features a live map that shows where employees are traveling in real time. Finance and travel teams can contact travelers directly within the application in emergency situations.

Partnerships

Navan partners with Sabre Corporation and the Amadeus IT Group for Global distribution system content and is a member of the Priceline Group Affiliate Network as well as the Expedia, Inc. Partner Network to combine inventories for flights, accommodations, and rental cars from direct, corporate, and consumer sites. 

Users can access mobile apps for Uber and Lyft in their mobile travel itineraries while traveling.

External links

References

Travel management
American companies established in 2015
Companies based in Palo Alto, California